Antonio Burgos Belinchón (born 1943 in Seville, Spain) is a Spanish traditionalist-conservative journalist, novelist, and multi-media writer.

He graduated in philosophy and literature from the University of Seville and in classical philology from the Autonomous University of Madrid.

Books

Gatos I
La historia de gatos
Alegatos de los Gatos
Rapsodia Española
Gatos sin fronteras
Gatos II
Alegatos de los Gatos
Juanito Valderrama
Gatos sin fronteras
Artículos de lujo
Juanito Valderrama
Jazmines en el ojal
Las cabañuelas de agosto
Mirando al mar soñé
Reloj, no marques las horas
Mi España querida
Artículos de lujo
El contrabandista de pájaros

References

External links

Spanish male writers
Spanish journalists
1943 births
Living people
University of Seville alumni